Blackwall is a suburb of the Central Coast region of New South Wales, Australia, south of Woy Woy on Brisbane Water,  north of the Sydney CBD. It is part of the  local government area.

The suburb includes a boat ramp and a bushland recreation reserve, Kitchener Reserve, offering walk trails and views from Blackwall Mountain. The section of the suburb east of Kitchener Park is locally known as Orange Grove.

Blackwall was, between 1862 and 1913, the site of the Rock Davis shipyard, and over 120 wooden-hulled vessels were built there. Among the best known were the fast Sydney Harbour ferry, Vaucluse, built in 1905, and the small twin-screw coastal steamer, Belbowrie, built in 1911. The last vessel built there was the ferry, Woollahra.

References

External links

Suburbs of the Central Coast (New South Wales)